Hans Uszkoreit is a German computational linguist.

Hans Uszkoreit studied Linguistics and Computer Science at the Technical University of Berlin and the University of Texas at Austin. While he was studying in Austin, he also worked as a research associate in a large machine translation project at the Linguistics Research Center.

Nowadays, he is teaching as a professor of Computational Linguistics at Saarland University. Moreover, he serves as a Scientific Director at the German Research Center for Artificial Intelligence (DFKI) where he heads the DFKI Language Technology Lab.

Work

Hans Uszkoreit, in 1988, was called to a position at Saarland University, to work in the field of Computational Linguistics. He created the Department of Computational Linguistics and Phonetics. In 1989 he was elected head of the Language Technology Lab at DFKI. Uszkoreit was also a co-founder and the principal investigator of the Special Collaborative Research Division (SFB 378) “Resource-Adaptive Cognitive Processes” and as the European Postgraduate Program Language Technology and Cognitive Systems’s co-founder and professor too. He is a member of the International Committee on Computational Linguistics and of the European Academy of Sciences and the Past President of the European Association for Logic, Language and Information, and a fellow of the Board of Directors of the European Network of Language and Speech, but also of the European Language Resources Association.

Awards
2002 Elected Member of the European Academy of Sciences
2012 Google Faculty Research Award
2013 Google Focused Research Award

References

Further reading

German research Center for Artificial Intelligence. Language Technology Lab.Retrieved: 18 May 2009. From: http://dfki.de/lt/lt-general.php
Hans Uszkoreit. Personal page. Retrieved 18, May 2009 from: http://hans.uszkoreit.net/

Linguists from Germany
Living people
1950 births
Computational linguistics researchers
Natural language processing researchers
Computer scientists